The MTV Video Music Award for Breakthrough Video was first awarded in 1988, replacing the award for Most Experimental Video. Along with Best Direction in a Video, this award was considered to be one of the most important professional categories at the VMAs, as every once in a while it was even presented during the main show (unlike most technical awards which were presented during the pre-show). The award for Breakthrough Video was given out every year from 1988 to 2005, after which it was retired. In 2009, however, MTV decided to bring back this category and continued to present it until 2011, when it was retired again. R.E.M. and Fatboy Slim are the two biggest winners of this award, as they each have won it twice. Art of Noise, meanwhile, is the only artist or group to have won this award under its two incarnations: Most Experimental Video in 1985 and Breakthrough Video in 1989.

Recipients

MTV Video Music Awards
Awards established in 1988
Awards disestablished in 2010